Devendra Verma is an Indian politician. He belongs to the Bhartiya Janta Party and has represented the Khandwa constituency since 2008 in the Madhya Pradesh Legislative Assembly. His father, Kishorilal Verma, was the state's Education Minister in the BJP government in the 1990s and represented the Pandhana constituency.
Devendra Verma won the 2018 election with a margin of 19,137 votes.

References 

Living people
Place of birth missing (living people)
Madhya Pradesh MLAs 2008–2013
Madhya Pradesh MLAs 2013–2018
Bharatiya Janata Party politicians from Madhya Pradesh
1975 births